Colten Teubert (born March 8, 1990) is a Canadian-German former professional ice hockey defenceman and current head coach of the Hampton Roads Whalers USPHL Elite team. He most notably played for the Edmonton Oilers in the National Hockey League (NHL) before moving to Europe in playing for the Iserlohn Roosters and the Thomas Sabo Ice Tigers of the Deutsche Eishockey Liga (DEL). He was drafted by the Los Angeles Kings in the first round, 13th overall, in the 2008 NHL Entry Draft. Prior to turning professional, he played in the Western Hockey League (WHL) with the Regina Pats, who drafted him first overall in the 2005 WHL Bantam Draft.

Playing career

Regina Pats
Teubert was the first overall selection in the 2005 WHL Bantam Draft by the Regina Pats. Teubert made his debut for the Pats in the 2005–06 season, playing 14 regular season games, where he picked up 2 assists and another 6 games in the playoffs. In 2006–07, his rookie season with the Pats, he led the team in rookie defenseman scoring. During the 2007-08 season, Teubert played in the CHL Top Prospects Game along with teammate Jordan Eberle. Teubert finished the season eighth in team scoring and fourth among defensemen. After the 2007–08 season, Teubert was drafted in the first round of the 2008 NHL Entry Draft 13th overall by the Los Angeles Kings.

During the 2008–09 season, Teubert served as an assistant captain for the Pats, and he also suited up for the WHL in the CHL Canada-Russia Challenge (Subway Super Series). He repeated both of these feats during the 2009–10 season. During the 2009 Subway Super Series, Teubert served as team captain for the WHL team for one game. On January 12, 2010, Teubert was named captain of the Pats. At the end of the 2009–10 season, Teubert was named the Regina Pats best defenseman.

Professional
Teubert attended training camp with the Los Angeles Kings prior to the 2008–09 and 2009–10 seasons, and was returned to the Pats each year. After the Pats' 2008–09 season was complete, Teubert made his professional debut when the Kings assigned him to the Ontario Reign of the ECHL on March 20, 2009. In September 2009, the Kings returned him to the Regina Pats. After the conclusion of the 2009–10 WHL season, Teubert was again assigned to the Reign for the conclusion of the 2009–10 ECHL season.

On February 28, 2011, Teubert was traded to the Edmonton Oilers along with Los Angeles's 2011 1st round draft pick and 2012 2nd round draft pick in a deadline day trade for Dustin Penner. Coincidentally, on November 3, 2011, Teubert played his first NHL game against the Kings. He played 24 games for the Oilers and 46 for AHL's Oklahoma City Barons that season. In 2012–13, Teubert saw the ice in 62 AHL contests for the Barons.

In 2013, he decided to continue his career abroad, accepting an offer from the Iserlohn Roosters of the German Deutsche Eishockey Liga (DEL). In February 2014, he inked a fresh two-year deal with the Roosters. When his contract was up following the 2015–16 season, he agreed to terms with DEL team Nürnberg Ice Tigers on a three-year deal.

International play

Teubert started his international career by representing British Columbia at the 2007 Canada Winter Games, where his team finished fourth. He played for Canada at both Under-18 tournaments, including the 2007 Memorial of Ivan Hlinka (fourth-place finish) and the 2008 World Under-18 Championships (gold medal). Teubert played for Canada at the World Junior Championships in 2009 and 2010. In 2009, he helped Canada win a gold medal, while in 2010 the team took home silver. Teubert served as one of the team's alternate captains during the 2010 tournament.

Coaching career
Following the conclusion of his contract with the Ice Tigers, having not played the previous two seasons due to injury, Teubert having retired from professional hockey was announced as the head coach of junior hockey team, the Bellingham Blazers of the Western States Hockey League, for the 2019–20 season. , Teubert took the position as the head coach of the United States Premier Hockey League Elite Division (USPHL Elite) team, the Hampton Roads Whalers, while also serving as an assistant coach with their Premier Division team.

Personal

He holds a German passport.
Teubert's parents are Carl and Shauna, and he has three brothers Kaid, Teran and Wyatt. His grand father moved from Germany to Canada.

Regina mayor Pat Fiacco proclaimed January 8, 2010, as "Jordan Eberle and Colten Teubert Day" in Regina.

Career statistics

Regular season and playoffs

International

References

External links

1990 births
Living people
Canadian expatriate ice hockey players in the United States
Canadian ice hockey defencemen
Canadian people of German descent
Edmonton Oilers players
German expatriate sportspeople in the United States
German ice hockey defencemen
Ice hockey people from British Columbia
Iserlohn Roosters players
Los Angeles Kings draft picks
Manchester Monarchs (AHL) players
National Hockey League first-round draft picks
Oklahoma City Barons players
Ontario Reign (ECHL) players
People from White Rock, British Columbia
Regina Pats players
Sportspeople from Surrey, British Columbia
Thomas Sabo Ice Tigers players